BPEA EQT  (formerly known as Baring Private Equity Asia and BPEA) is an Asian private equity firm. Previously it was an affiliate of Barings Bank before becoming an independent firm. In 2022 it was acquired by EQT Partners to act as its Asian investment platform. It is one of the largest private equity firms in Asia.

History 
Baring Private Equity Asia (BPEA) was founded in 1997 as a subsidiary of Baring Private Equity International (BPEP International) which was an affiliate of Barings Bank. In addition to BPEA, the affiliates of BPEP International include Baring Vostok Capital Partners, Baring Private Equity Partners India and GP Investments.

In 2000, Jean Eric Salata led a management buyout of BPEA leading it to be established as an independent Firm.

In 2016, Affiliated Managers Group acquired a 15% minority stake in BPEA.

In 2017, BPEA launched it's Credit investment unit in India after acquiring the Credit unit of Religare Global Asset Management.

In March 2022, EQT Partners acquired BPEA for $7.5 billion. On October, the acquisition was complete and the firm was renamed to BPEA EQT.

Business overview 
BPEA EQT mainly focuses on the Asia Pacific Region. It has three investment strategies which are:
 Private Equity
 Real Estate (operates under the EQT Exeter brand)
 Credit (operates as BPEA Credit that focuses on India)

BPEA EQT has offices in Beijing, Hong Kong, Mumbai, Seoul, Shanghai, Singapore, Sydney and Tokyo.

Funds

Private Equity

Real Estate

Credit

Portfolio companies 

 Cath Kidston Limited
 Clarivate Analytics
 Coforge
 JD Health
 Kyobo Life Insurance Company Limited
 Nord Anglia Education
 Pioneer
 Prometric
 RBL Bank
 SAI Global
 Shinhan Financial Group
 Solera
 St. George's University
 TELUS International
 Tricor
 Virtusa
 Vistra

Notable Transactions 
 In 2011, BPEA EQT sold its holding in Hsu Fu Chi to Nestlé in a $1.7 billion deal.
 In 2012, BPEA EQT successfully exited Courts Asia by listing it on the Singapore Stock Exchange.
 In 2015, BPEA EQT acquired a majority stake in Vistra from IK Investment Partners.
In 2016, BPEA EQT and Onex corporation acquired the Intellectual Property & Science business of Thomson Reuters for $3.55 billion.
 In 2017, Post Holdings acquired Weetabix Limited, UK based manufacturer of the Weetabix, Alpen and Ready Brek brands of breakfast cereals, from Bright Food and BPEA EQT for $1.4 billion.
 In 2018, BPEA EQT sold its holding in PSB Academy to Intermediate Capital Group.
In 2020, BPEA EQT and CITIC Capital sold their holdings in Wall Street English to its original founder, Luigi Tiziano Peccenini.
In 2021, BPEA EQT acquired Virtusa for $2 billion.
In November 2021, BPEA EQT acquired Tricor from Permira in a $2.8 billion deal.
In September 2022, BPEA EQT explored merging two of its portfolio companies, Tricor and Vistra in a $8 billion deal.

References

External links 
 

Alternative investment management companies
Companies of Hong Kong
Financial services companies established in 1997
Investment banking private equity groups
Private equity firms of Asia-Pacific
2022 mergers and acquisitions